Sir Edward Charles Stirling  (8 September 1848 – 20 March 1919) was an Australian anthropologist and the first professor of physiology at the University of Adelaide.

Early life
Stirling was born at "The Lodge" Strathalbyn, South Australia, the eldest son of the Hon. Edward Stirling and his wife Harriett, née Taylor  His father was the illegitimate child of a Scottish planter in Jamaica and an unknown woman of colour. He was a partner in Elder Stirling and Company before that firm became Elder Smith and Company, was a nominated member of the 1855 Legislative Council, and was an elected member of the 1857 Legislative Council. Edward Snr. migrated to South Australia after receiving £1000 from his father, Archibald, who had owned slaves in Jamaica.

Stirling was educated at St Peter's College, Adelaide, and Trinity College, Cambridge, where he graduated B.A. with honours in natural science in 1869, M.A. and M.B. in 1872, and M.D. in 1880. Stirling was admitted to the Fellowship of the Royal College of Surgeons (FRCS) in 1874.

Career

Stirling was appointed house surgeon at St George's Hospital, London, and in early 1878 became assistant surgeon and lecturer on physiology and operative surgery. Stirling returned to South Australia in 1875 and on 27 June 1877 married Jane, eldest daughter of Joseph Gilbert, and took his new wife to London for medical treatment. Their daughter Jane Harriet was born in London April 1878. Stirling returned to Adelaide for good in 1881, and in the following year was appointed lecturer in physiology at the University of Adelaide where he helped found the medical school.

In 1884 Stirling was elected to the South Australian Legislative Assembly for North Adelaide and sat for three years. There he proved an innovator and speaker for the rights of women, becoming the first person in Australasia to introduce a bill for women's suffrage. On 22 July 1885, the year after his election, he proposed the following motion for women's suffrage:
'That in the opinion of this House, women… who fulfil the conditions and possess the qualifications on which the parliamentary franchise for the Legislative Council is granted to men, shall, like them, be admitted to the franchise for both Houses of Parliament.'
He then expanded on his argument for women's suffrage using the following quote from Plato: 
'There is no natural difference between the sexes except in strength and both should equally participate in the Government of the State.'
By this time he had four daughters of his own, and he wanted them to grow up in a fairer society. Then in 1886 he introduced a formal bill for women's suffrage into the South Australian parliament. Although this bill was not passed, a few years later South Australia was the first of the Australian colonies to give women the vote.

Not only was Stirling committed to the political rights of women, but he also believed in their right to a proper education. He lectured at the Advanced School for Girls, and also campaigned for women to be admitted to Adelaide University's School of Medicine. His own five daughters benefited from an excellent education, and Harriet (1878–1943) went on to earn an OBE for her work with mothers and children, and Jane (1881–1966) earned a Bachelor of Science degree from Adelaide University and later played viola in the South Australian Orchestra.

Edward Charles Stirling was appointed the first President of the State Children's Council by its founder Catherine Helen Spence. A later President was his oldest daughter Harriet (OBE), who also founded the Mothers and Babies Health Association with Helen Mayo.

Stirling had other interests and duties. He was chairman of the South Australian Museum committee in 1884–5 and in 1889 became honorary director of the museum. In 1890 he went overland with South Australia's Governor, Lord Kintore, from Port Darwin to Adelaide and collected much flora and fauna including several specimens of the marsupial mole Notoryctes typhlops, described and illustrated in his paper in the Transactions and Proceedings of the Royal Society of South Australia, 1891, p. 154. In 1893 he investigated at Lake Callabonna a remarkable deposit of fossil bones, and with A. H. C. Zietz reconstructed the complete skeleton of the enormous marsupial Diprotodon australis and partially reconstructed an immense wombat and a bird allied to the New Zealand moa. Also in 1893, Stirling and Zietz described five new species of Australian lizards. He was also responsible for the collection of human remains of Indigenous Australians, some of which were shipped to overseas institutions. In the 21st century, the Museum started pursuing an active policy of repatriation and reburial of these remains.

In 1894 Stirling was the medical officer and anthropologist of the Horn scientific expedition to Central Australia, and wrote the extensive anthropology report which appears in volume four of the report of the expedition. He was appointed director of the Adelaide museum in 1895 and built up there a remarkable collection including invaluable specimens relating to aboriginal life in Australia. In 1900 he became professor of physiology at Adelaide university, and for many years continued to take a prominent part in university affairs. He retired from the directorship of the museum at the end of 1912, but in 1914 was made honorary curator in ethnology. He had announced his intention of retiring from the university at the end of the year but died after a short illness on 20 March 1919.

Stirling was interred at the North Road Cemetery, where his grave now lies near those of several other family members. He was survived by his wife and five daughters (two sons predeceased him).

Private life
In 1882, E. C. Stirling settled near the Adelaide Hills town of Stirling which had been named after his father. He named his 6½-acre property St Vigeans, after the Scottish town where his father had gone to school. A fine two-storey house was constructed in 1882–83, and during the following decades, Stirling himself oversaw the establishment of one of Australia's finest private botanical gardens which included trees and shrubs imported from interstate and overseas. As a fellow of the Royal Horticultural Society of London he had access to many species of plants. A major feature of his gardens were South Australia's first rhododendrons, one of which was named Mrs E C Stirling, and several new varieties were developed by Edward and his head-gardener.

Family
Edward Charles Stirling married Jane Gilbert (1848–1936) on 27 June 1877. Their offspring were:
Harriet Adelaide "Harrie" Stirling JP OBE (15 April 1878 – 19 May 1943), philanthropist
Anna Florence Stirling (1879–1939) married S (Sydney) Russell Booth (died 1949) in 1910
Jane Winifred "Jeannie" Stirling (1881–1966); studied science at Uni, played viola in SA Orchestra, married Thorburn Brailsford Robertson on 8 July 1910
(Alice) Mary Stirling (1884–1925); an Exhibition (form of scholarship) to be competed for among Hills schools was raised in her memory
Nina Eliza Emmeline Stirling (1888–1976) married Maxwell Jaffrey on 29 August 1927
Edward Taylor Stirling (1889–1897) died falling from a tree aged 7;
Gilbert Lancelot Stirling (1893–1893)

Stirling's brother John Lancelot Stirling also played a prominent role in South Australian public life.

His eldest sister Mary Eliza Collingwood Stirling married William James Ingram MP on 10 November 1874.

Honours and awards
Stirling received many honours, of which he particularly valued being admitted as a Fellow of the Royal Society in 1893. In the same year, he was also awarded an CMG Other awards included the Queen Regent of Holland's Gold Medal for 'services to art and science' in 1892, and an honorary Doctorate in Science from Trinity College Cambridge in 1910. He was also an honorary fellow of the Anthropological Society of Great Britain, fellow of the Medical and Chirurgical Society, and was knighted in 1917.

Legacy
Stirling was interested in gardening, in the Society for the Prevention of Cruelty to Animals, and in the welfare of children – he was president of the state children's council. He was a surgeon, physiologist, anthropologist, palaeontologist and legislator, although not sufficiently specialised to reach the highest rank in any one of these departments. With Dr Joseph. C. Verco Stirling wrote a valuable article on hydatid disease for Allbutt's System of Medicine, he fostered and brought to maturity the young medical school at the University, and he did significant work in developing the Adelaide museum. Stirling was involved in the struggle to create the Flinders Chase sanctuary on Kangaroo Island. Stirling ranks among the best all-round scientists of his day in Australia.

References
Notes

Bibliography

 Primary sources including certificates recording birth, examination results, marriage, name change and death [private records held by AS Pope – files:  ‘Stirling, EC’, work, documents, cuttings, life, will, photographs.
 Hale, HM 1956, The First Hundred Years of the South Australian Museum 1856–1956, Records of the SA Museum, Vol XII, 18 June 1956, Adelaide.
 Last, Peter 1949, ‘The Founder of the Adelaide Medical School’, The AMSS Review, November 1949, pp 7–21.
 Waite, Edgar R 1929, The Reptiles and Amphibians of SA, Government Printer, Adelaide, pp 102, 125–128
 Mt Barker Courier:
 Oral history: ES Booth (SOHC/MLSA OH295).

External links

1848 births
1919 deaths
Australian anthropologists
Companions of the Order of St Michael and St George
Fellows of the Royal College of Surgeons
Fellows of the Royal Society
Knights Bachelor
People educated at St Peter's College, Adelaide
Academic staff of the University of Adelaide
Members of the South Australian House of Assembly
Alumni of Trinity College, Cambridge
Burials at North Road Cemetery
People from Strathalbyn, South Australia
Australian people of Scottish descent
Australian people of Jamaican descent